5-Fluoro-α-ethyltryptamine (5-F-AET) is a tryptamine derivative which acts as a serotonin–dopamine releasing agent and agonist of the 5-HT2A receptor.

See also 
 4-Methyl-AET
 5-Chloro-AMT
 5-Fluoro-AMT
 5-Fluoro-DMT
 5-Fluoro-MET
 5-MeO-AET
 6-Fluoro-AMT
 7-Chloro-AMT
 7-Methyl-DMT
 7-Methyl-AET

References 

Designer drugs
Psychedelic tryptamines
Serotonin receptor agonists
Fluoroarenes